The Grey Sisterhood is a 1916 American silent short mystery directed by Edward LeSaint. Starring William Garwood in the lead role, it was the second film in the five film series Lord John's Journal.

Cast
William Garwood as Lord John
Stella Razetto as Maida Odell
Ogden Crane as Roger Odell
Carmen Phillips
Doc Crane as L.J. Calit
Laura Oakley as Head Sister
Albert MacQuarrie

See also
Lord John in New York (1915)
Three Fingered Jenny (1916)
The Eye of Horus (1916)
The League of the Future (1916)

References

External links

1916 films
American silent short films
American black-and-white films
American mystery films
Films directed by Edward LeSaint
1916 mystery films
1916 short films
1910s American films
Silent mystery films